Windom's Way is a 1957 British thriller film directed by Ronald Neame and starring Peter Finch and Mary Ure. Made in Eastman Color, it is set during the Malayan Emergency.

Premise
Dr Alec Windom is a British doctor who works in a village in Malaya. He is visited by his estranged wife Lee.

Cast

Main cast
 Peter Finch as Alec Windom
 Mary Ure as Lee Windom
 Natasha Parry as Anna Vidal
 Robert Flemyng as Colonel George Hasbrook
 Michael Hordern as Patterson
 Grégoire Aslan as Mayor Lollivar

Supporting cast
 John Cairney as Jan Vidal
 Marne Maitland as Commissioner Belhedron
 George Margo as Police Officer Lansang
 Kurt Siegenberg as Kosti

Cameo/Uncredited cast
 Martin Benson as Samcar, Rebel Commander
 Sanny Bin Hussan as Father Amyan
 Burt Kwouk as Father Amyan's Aide
 Olaf Pooley as Colonel Lupat
 John A. Tinn as Patrol Leader

Original novel
The film was based on a 1952 novel by James Ramsey Ullman, which was reportedly inspired by Dr. Gordon S. Seagrave, who was imprisoned for allegedly helping the Karen people. The novel was set in the fictitious island state of Papaan.

Ullman says he wanted to tell the story how "in between man – call him the liberal – can get caught between the rollers of fanaticism or authoritarianism on either side; the case of a man trying to do his job and be a human being among other human beings and how hard this is in the twentieth century." Ullman admitted the story of Seagrove "was somewhere in the back of my mind" when he wrote the book.

The book was a Literary Guild choice and became a best seller in the US. Ullman wrote a first draft of a play based on the book.

Production
Film rights to Windom's Way were bought by Carl Foreman, who wrote the script. He sold the rights to this and two other properties to Earl St John of Rank Film Productions, who in January 1955 announced it as part of its schedule for that year (but it would not be made for another two years).

The script was rewritten and 'Anglicized' by Anthony Perry. Perry's draft was considered too "political" and was rewritten by Jill Craigie to be softened. However, the resulting work was considerably more left-wing than Rank's other colonial war films of this time such as The Planter's Wife and Simba.
 
Ronald Neame had just left The Seventh Sin (1957) during production. He was contacted by his old producing partner John Bryan who suggested Neame make Windom's Way with Peter Finch.

Finch made the film immediately after returning from Australia where he made Robbery Under Arms. Part of the location shoot took place in Corsica. The rest was filmed at Pinewood.

Neame says Corsica was a "difficult location".

Reception

Box Office
"It was not a successful picture, I'm afraid", said Neame later. "I think it fell between two stools, neither politically profound nor exciting enough as an action film. John just liked the book very much and I would have directed anything to get back to the studios again."

"The finished film may have had too many messages for people to stay interested", Neame later wrote. "It was neither a hit nor a disgrace."

Critical
Variety called it "a slowish but well-made intelligent drama".

The New York Times said the film was "without any topical teeth" in which Windom's "political sympathies, like the geography, are so vague that one need have no fear of being subverted by associating with him in this film. All one needs to worry about, precisely, is being a little provoked and bored."

Awards
The film was nominated for four British Academy of Film and Television Arts awards in 1958.

References

Notes

External links

Windom' Way at Colonial Film
Windom's Way at BFI
Variety review of film

1957 films
British drama films
Films directed by Ronald Neame
Films shot at Pinewood Studios
Films scored by James Bernard
Films shot in Corsica
Films set in Malaysia
British thriller films
Films about the Malayan Emergency
1950s English-language films
1950s British films